Events from the year 1759 in Denmark.

Incumbents
 Monarch – Frederick V
 Prime minister – Johan Ludvig Holstein-Ledreborg

Events

Births
 15 January – Jørgen Mandix, judge (died 1835)
 19 July – Christopher Friedenreich Hage, merchant (died 1849)

Deaths
 9 May – Johan Friederich Wewer, merchant (born 1699)
 5 September – Lauritz de Thurah, architect (born 1706)
 29 October – Anne Dorthe Lund, actress

References

 
1750s in Denmark
Denmark
Years of the 18th century in Denmark